The coats of arms of the twelve provinces of the Netherlands are shown here.

See also 
Flags of provinces of the Netherlands

 
.Coats of arms
nl:Lijst van wapens van Nederlandse deelgebieden#Wapens van provincies van Nederland